is a train station of the Kumagawa Railroad Yunomae Line in Yunomae, Kumamoto Prefecture, Japan.

Railway stations in Japan opened in 1924